The Poolburn Gorge is a gorge located in the Central Otago region of the South Island of New Zealand, 4 km east of the small settlement of Lauder.  The Ida Burn flows through the 2.5 km long canyon across the Raggedy Range between the Ida Valley and the Manuherikia Valley. There are no public roads through the gorge; only the track of the former Otago Central Railway, now used as the Otago Central Rail Trail, follows the river on the southern flanks of the gorge.

The landscape surrounding Poolburn Gorge is barren and dry, shaped by the typical Central Otago climate of dry hot summers and cold winters. The gorge cuts through schist rock bluffs, with the vegetation on the steep slopes consisting of tussock and hardy low-growing shrubs.  Contrasting this, a ribbon of lush trees lines the immediate river banks at the bottom of the gorge.  The Ida Burn joins the Manuherikia River shortly after it emerges from the Poolburn Gorge into the Manuherikia Valley.

The Pool Burn was known to southern Māori as Te Waipapapa o Karetai - the water container of Karetai, a Ngāi Tahu chief.

Otago Central Railway and Rail Trail
The Poolburn Gorge section of the Otago Central Branch Railway encompasses two bridges and two tunnels, and gently snakes along the true left (south side) of the gorge.  The construction of the railway line through the gorge took over three years, with up to 300 workers employed at the peak of construction around 1902.

Schist quarried from outcrops close by was trimmed and bolstered to construct the piers and abutments with the help of large gantry hoists to lift and position the stone slabs.

Shortly into the gorge, two tunnels have been cut through schist rock bluffs. Torches are needed to walk or cycle through these tunnels (typically provided with hired bikes).
Both tunnels feature portals with bolstered schist slab facings, with the arches outlined in brick.  The inside walls of the tunnels are lined with brick about  into the tunnels; afterwards the walls are just the bare rock.

This concrete pier bridge is the longest on the line and was completed in 1903. It is one of only two curved bridges on the rail trail, the other being in Hyde.

In 1990, the railway line was closed from Middlemarch onwards, which includes the Poolburn Gorge section.  The tracks were lifted, and later in 2000, the line was converted to a bike trail, which included re-decking both bridges with timber and re-surfacing the track with fine gravel.

The Poolburn Gorge section of the Otago Central Railway is the most popular section of this multi-day bike track.  The gorge can be traversed by bike as a day trip from Oturehua to Omakau, or in 1–2 hours from Auripo to Omakau, or as a 3-4 hour return bike trip from Omakau.  Local operators in Omakau and Oturehua provide bike hire and transport, with both villages offering accommodation options as well.

The bike track gently descends through the scenic Poolburn Gorge from east to west and takes in the Poolburn Viaduct, the two tunnels cut through schist rock, and the bridge over the Manuherikia River.  Just after the second tunnel, two short walking tracks can be explored - one to the bluff above the tunnel portal, the other to the remnants of a construction worker village.  After the rail trail exits the gorge, it offers good views over the Manuherikia Valley and towards the Hawkdun Range.

References

External links

Canyons and gorges of Otago